Associazione Sportiva Dilettantistica Mezzolara is an Italian association football club located in Mezzolara, a frazione of Budrio, Emilia-Romagna. It currently plays in Serie D.

History
The club was founded in 1965.

Colors and badge
Its colors are white and light blue.

References

External links
 Official homepage

 
Football clubs in Italy
Association football clubs established in 1965
Football clubs in Emilia-Romagna
Italian football clubs established in 1965